Muskegon (YTB‑763), was a United States Navy .  She is the second ship to be named for Muskegon, Michigan.

Construction
The contract for Muskegon was awarded 7 December 1961. She was laid down on 1 February 1962 at Slidell, Louisiana, by Southern Shipbuilding Corporation and launched 8 August 1962.

Operational history
Assigned as a yard tug to the 11th Naval District at San Diego, Muskegon remained there into 1969. Sometime before March 1994 Muskegon was transferred to Commander Fleet Activities Yokosuka, Japan.

References

External links
 

Natick-class large harbor tugs
1962 ships
Ships built in Slidell, Louisiana